The North American P-51 Mustang is an American World War II fighter aircraft.

P51 or P-51 may also refer to:

Vessels 
 , a patrol vessel of the Argentine Navy
 , a submarine of the Royal Navy
 , a patrol vessel of the Indian Navy
 , a patrol vessel of the Irish Naval Service

Other uses 
 BenQ-Siemens P51, a PDA smartphone
 P-51 can opener, issued by the United States Armed Forces
 Papyrus 51, a biblical manuscript
 Parker 51, a fountain pen
 P51, a state regional road in Latvia